The Strawberries and Cream Tree is a graft hybrid cherry tree (of Prunus avium and P. serrulata 'Kanzan') in Backwell, North Somerset, England. Planted on council land in the 1950s, it is noted for producing two distinct colours of blossom: pink blossom on one side of the tree and white on the other, when it blooms every spring. This gave rise to the name 'Strawberries and Cream Tree', which was coined by children of the village.

It is one of only two reported examples of  cherry-Kanzan graft hybrid trees in England; the other being in Portchester, Hampshire.

Botany 

The Strawberries and Cream Tree is a native wild cherry tree (Prunus avium) grafted with Prunus 'Kanzan', an ornamental cherry variety from Japan. The wild cherry produces the white blossom, while the 'Kanzan' produces the pink blossom. The dual blossom gave rise to the name 'Strawberries and Cream Tree', coined by children of the village.

Fruit trees tend to be grafted onto the rootstock of a hardier tree variety, usually to provide them with additional water and nutrients. In the case of the Strawberries and Cream tree, the rootstock grew along with the tree, creating a graft hybrid.

History
The Strawberries and Cream Tree was planted on public land which is now owned by North Somerset Council, on Rodney Road in the village of Backwell. It is not known who originally planted and grafted the tree, but it is believed to have been planted in the late 1950s.

Tree preservation order
Due to its rarity, the Strawberries and Cream Tree was granted a six-month tree preservation order on 14 December 2019. The order prevents the cutting down, lopping or topping of the tree without prior permission from the council. The order may be made permanent in the future.

References

Individual trees in England
North Somerset